Stacked Rubbish is the third studio album by Japanese rock band the Gazette. It was released on July 4, 2007, in Japan and on August 24 in Europe. It was later re-released in Europe and North America on August 14, 2015, by JPU Records.

Stacked Rubbish debuted at number three on the Oricon charts with 33,007 units sold in the first week. The limited edition comes with a slipcase with alternative cover art and a special lyrics booklet. This was the first album to contain any songs by Kai.

Track listing 
All music is by the Gazette and all lyrics are by Ruki.
 "Art Drawn By Vomit" – 1:49
 "Agony" – 4:15
 "Hyena" – 4:16
 "Burial Applicant" – 4:27
 "Ganges ni Akai Bara" (ガンジスに紅い薔薇; The Ganges Red Roses) – 4:08
 "Regret" – 4:30
 "Calm Envy" – 6:05
 "Swallowtail on the Death Valley" – 4:06
 "Mob 136 Bars" – 2:39
 "Gentle Lie" – 3:53
 "Filth in the Beauty" – 4:11
 "Circle of Swindler" – 2:58
 "Chizuru" (千鶴; A Thousand Cranes) – 5:47
 "People Error" – 2:58

Disc two (DVD, limited edition only)
 "Burial Applicant
 "Chizuru "Apartment" Movie Version" (千鶴 (映画[アパートメント]劇場上映ver.); Movie [Apartment] Theater Screening)

References

2007 albums
The Gazette (band) albums